Germantown is a home rule-class city in Bracken and Mason counties in the U.S. state of Kentucky. The population was 154 at the 2010 census.

The Bracken County portion of Germantown is part of the Cincinnati/Northern Kentucky metropolitan area, while the Mason County portion is part of the Maysville micropolitan area.

History
Germantown was platted in 1794 and named after German immigrants. The city was incorporated by the Virginia state legislature in 1795. A post office called Germantown has been in operation since 1817.

Geography
Germantown is located at  (38.654693, -83.963397). It is primarily in eastern Bracken County and extends into western Mason County. Kentucky Route 10 passes through the center of town, leading east (via Kentucky Route 9)  to Maysville on the Ohio River, and west  to Brooksville, the Bracken County seat.

Demographics

As of the census of 2000, there were 190 people, 81 households, and 55 families residing in the city. The racial makeup of the city was 98.42% White and 1.58% African American.

There were 81 households, out of which 29.6% had children under the age of 18 living with them, 60.5% were married couples living together, 6.2% had a female householder with no husband present, and 30.9% were non-families. 27.2% of all households were made up of individuals, and 14.8% had someone living alone who was 65 years of age or older. The average household size was 2.35 and the average family size was 2.77.

In the city, the population was spread out, with 22.6% under the age of 18, 7.9% from 18 to 24, 32.1% from 25 to 44, 17.9% from 45 to 64, and 19.5% who were 65 years of age or older. The median age was 39 years. For every 100 females, there were 88.1 males. For every 100 females age 18 and over, there were 86.1 males.

The median income for a household in the city was $27,500, and the median income for a family was $32,500. Males had a median income of $20,833 versus $22,813 for females. The per capita income for the city was $16,973. About 9.7% of families and 11.8% of the population were below the poverty line, including 16.7% of those under the age of eighteen and 20.4% of those 65 or over.

Government
The government of Germantown is composed of a mayor and four city council members. Council members are elected every two years on even numbered years and the mayor is elected every four years, also on even years.  The council member receiving the most votes in the council elections is designated as the vice-mayor.

Current officials include:

Mayor:  
Council members:

The city also contains the Germantown Volunteer Fire Department, Established in 1927 that operates in Bracken and Mason counties as a Fire, Rescue, and EMS First Responder Service.

Notable people
Carl Bouldin, baseball player
Elle Smith, journalist and Miss USA 2021

References

External links
 Historical Images and Texts of Germantown, Kentucky
History of Germantown

 

Cities in Kentucky
Cities in Bracken County, Kentucky
Cities in Mason County, Kentucky
Maysville, Kentucky micropolitan area